WLYD (93.5 FM) is a radio station broadcasting a country music format. Licensed to Chandler, Indiana, United States, the station serves the Evansville area. The station is currently owned by Midwest Communications, Inc. and features programming from Westwood One.

History
The then-WJPS-FM broadcast an oldies format until February 2005, when South Central, looking to capitalize on Regent Broadcasting's change of WYNG 94.9 to Sports Talk under ESPN Radio, converted the station to a country format, and changed the call letters to WLFW.

The staff is Tommy Mason (Morning Show Personality), Kim Kavanaw (Midday Personality), Rusty James (station Program Director and is heard afternoons), and in the evenings the station airs CMT Radio Live with Cody Alan.

It was announced on May 28, 2014, that Midwest Communications would purchase 9 of the 10 Stations owned by South Central Communications. The purchase included the Evansville Cluster: WLFW, along with Sister Stations WABX, WIKY-FM & WSTO. With this purchase, Midwest Communications would expand its portfolio of stations to Evansville, Knoxville and Nashville. The sale was finalized on September 2, 2014, at a price of $72 million.

On January 26, 2015, WLFW changed their format to classic country, branded as "93.5 Duke FM".

On October 2, 2018, 93.5 flipped back to country as "93.5 The Lloyd" with new callsign WLYD, the name coming from the Lloyd Expressway which cuts through downtown Evansville and which in turn is named after former Evansville mayor Russell G. Lloyd, Sr.

Previous logos

References

External links

LYD
Midwest Communications radio stations
Radio stations established in 1994
1994 establishments in Indiana
Country radio stations in the United States